Spider-Man 2: Enter Electro is a 2001 action-adventure video game based on the Marvel Comics character Spider-Man. It was developed by Vicarious Visions and published by Activision for the PlayStation. It is the sequel to Spider-Man (2000), and directly follows the events of that game, as Spider-Man tries to stop Electro from becoming all-powerful using a mechanism called the Bio-Nexus Device. Like its predecessor, the game features several classic Spider-Man villains as bosses, including the Shocker, Hammerhead, the Lizard, Sandman, and Electro, as well as his charged-up Hyper-Electro persona, created exclusively for the game.

Enter Electro received moderate favorable reviews, with critics generally considering it to be a downgrade from its predecessor. The game gained some fame for having its final level modified after the September 11 attacks; originally set to take place on top of the World Trade Center, the setting was later changed to a generic skyscraper. It was followed by Spider-Man and Spider-Man 2 for the home video game consoles and PlayStation Portable, based on the first two films released in 2002 and 2004, while the standalone sequel for the Game Boy Advance, Spider-Man: Mysterio's Menace, was released in September 2001.

Gameplay
One major difference between the game and its predecessor is the ability to play on ground levels. In the first game's outdoor levels, if Spider-Man swung too low below designated rooftops, he would fall into yellow mist that dominated most of the game's levels and die. This game, however, presented levels based in limited city streets. They were confined grids rather than a free-roam environment.

The enemies in Enter Electro are more realistic than the ones in the previous game, with the lizardmen and alien symbiotes being replaced by criminals, drones and robots. In this game, Spider-Man has the ability to shoot a Web Ball while in mid-air. Spider-Man can also attach electricity and ice to his webbing. This time, the training mode takes the player to the X-Men's Danger Room Simulator wherein Rogue and Professor X assist and navigate Spider-Man on what he needs to know with everything that may be useful during the course of gameplay. The hand animation is also changed. Now, every character's hands can react instead of waving fists. The basic punch and kick combo moves are also changed, doing away with the two-handed uppercut/mule kick for the third strike. Spider-Man only has one jump animation in this game, with him having two in the predecessor. The game primarily features only four credited voice actors: Rino Romano as Spider-Man and Jennifer Hale as Dr. Watts and Rogue, meanwhile Daran Norris and Dee Bradley Baker provided the rest of the voices.

By completing certain in-game goals, new costumes can be unlocked for Spider-Man. Many of them have special powers to alter the game experience. Included are all the costumes from the first game, with the same abilities, as well as several new outfits. A new option called "Create-A-Spider" mode allows the player to apply up to three in-game powers to any unlocked costume. The game powers include enhanced strength, unlimited webbing and invincibility.

Two additional costumes designed by comicbook artist Alex Ross were also featured in the game, one of which was a prototype costume design for the then-upcoming 2002 Spider-Man movie.

Plot
Shortly after the events of Spider-Man, a series of robberies led by Electro take place throughout New York City. While out on patrol, Spider-Man spots one of the robberies taking place at a building owned by BioTech. Planting a Spider-Tracer on the head thief's motorcycle, Spider-Man follows it to an abandoned warehouse where the thief is passing off a stolen briefcase to a contact. Spider-Man takes out the thugs and interrogates one of them, before being forced to fight the head thug: Shocker.

After defeating Shocker, Spider-Man follows the thug's tip and heads for an airfield, where the contact is headed towards. Along the way, he is forced to disable a bomb threat, take out a machine-gun nest, and stop a runaway airplane from crashing. As the contact escapes via helicopter, Spider-Man plants another tracer on it and tracks it to a train yard owned by Hammerhead, where he must fight through the mob-employed night staff and Sandman to stop the contact from fleeing aboard a train. Spider-Man eventually confronts the contact, the Beetle, and although the latter manages to escape with the briefcase, he unknowingly leaves behind a clue for Spider-Man: an invitation to the Science and Industry Ball.

Meanwhile, Electro explains his master plan to his accomplices: to use the Bio-Nexus Device, which can amplify one's bio-energy to power a city block, to amplify his own powers to godlike levels. The villains have acquired most of the pieces that make up the device, but they still need its power source. Believing its creator, Dr. Watts, might know where it is located, Electro sends Hammerhead and his men to kidnap her at the ball. Hammerhead takes several people hostage, but is foiled by Spider-Man, who rescues the hostages before facing and defeating Hammerhead. However, Dr. Watts is captured by Sandman during the confusion.

Looking for more information on Dr. Watts and why she is sought by the villains, Spider-Man calls Dr. Curt Connors, her colleague at BioTech, only to hear strange roars on the other end of the line. Deciding to investigate what happened to Connors, Spider-Man infiltrates BioTech and makes his way past security to reach Connors' lab, where he finds the scientist has transformed into the Lizard. After creating an antidote to restore Connors back to normal, Spider-Man learns from him about Electro's plans with the Bio-Nexus Device. He then goes to investigate Dr. Watts' lab and discovers that the device can be powered by a special sapphire. After defeating Sandman, Spider-Man sees a newspaper article about the sapphire on display at the museum, and rushes to get there before Electro.

Electro beats Spider-Man to the museum, but the latter defeats him inside the planetarium and secures the sapphire. Still holding Dr. Watts hostage, Electro coerces Spider-Man into giving him the sapphire by threatening the doctor's life. Spider-Man throws the jewel into the air as Electro releases Dr. Watts, but when the former attempts to take back the sapphire with his webs, he misses, allowing Electro to grab it. The Bio-Nexus Device complete, Electro uses it to supercharge himself into "Hyper-Electro", an all-powerful being made of pure electrical energy, and flies away in a bolt of lighting. Spider-Man follows him to the top of a nearby skyscraper where, unable to directly attack him, instead uses the tower's generators to overload the Bio-Nexus Device, destroying it and ending Electro's power play for good.

The next day, Thor is credited in the Daily Bugle with saving New York from Electro, much to Spider-Man's disappointment. In prison, Electro moans over his defeat as he shares a cell with Hammerhead and Shocker, who try to ignore him and play cards. When he gets bored of poker, Shocker decides to ask the villains from the first game, who are imprisoned in a nearby cell, if they know how to play Go Fish.

Development

Delay and modifications
Following the September 11 attacks, Activision halted production of the game in order to remove references to buildings resembling the Twin Towers of the World Trade Center, change the final battle stages, re-edit the cutscenes, and add a large bridge to the model of the World Trade Center. Several levels were renamed and other minor changes were made to levels and cutscenes in order to avoid any reference to the World Trade Center and 9/11, although the background World Trade Center and Empire State Building remained on cutscenes and even seen on trailers.

Reception

Spider-Man 2: Enter Electro received a moderately positive reception, albeit lower than that of the first game. Critics noted the choice of villains was more obscure than its predecessor, and the short length of time to complete the game was another point of criticism. The game's storyline was divisive, as some saw it as below average and not up to par with the last installment, while others enjoyed it. The graphics, voice acting, soundtrack, and gameplay received praise, however. Jeff Lundrigan of Next Generation called it "a worthy successor, if not as exceptional as the original". In Japan, where the game was ported and published by Success on October 31, 2002, Famitsu gave it a score of 27 out of 40.

Sequel
A standalone sequel titled Spider-Man: Mysterio's Menace was released in 2001. In addition, the video game adaptation of the 2002 film shares a similar gameplay style and control scheme and could be considered a spiritual third game.

References

External links
 
 

2001 video games
3D platform games
Activision beat 'em ups
Impact of the September 11 attacks on the video game industry
PlayStation (console) games
PlayStation (console)-only games
Success (company) games
Superhero video games
Video games based on Spider-Man
Video games set in New York City
Video games developed in the United States
Single-player video games
Vicarious Visions games